A beef tomato (British English) or beefsteak tomato (American English) is a large tomato. Most are pink or red with numerous small seed compartments (locules) distributed throughout the fruit, sometimes displaying pronounced ribbing similar to ancient pre-Columbian tomato cultivars. While popular among home growers for beef sandwich toppings and other applications requiring a large tomato such as toppings on large steaks, beefsteaks are not grown commercially as often as other types, since they are not considered as suitable for mechanization as smaller slicing tomatoes. Non-commercially, however, they are the most popularly grown tomato in North America.

Common varieties
Beefmaster VFN, a popular hybrid beefsteak
Beefsteak VFN
Big Beef
Brandywine, (a pink heirloom variety
Bucking Bronco
Cherokee Purple, a dusky red/purple beefsteak, said to have exceptional flavour
Marmande
Mortgage Lifter, another popular heirloom variety
Pink Beefsteak

In Italy and France
Both in Italy, first, and France, later, a variety of beefsteak tomato is produced which looks like a beef heart in shape, as it is pointing down.

In Italy, the cuore di bue has been registered, but not in France, where some companies continue naming tomatoes with different qualities cœur de bœuf.

See also
 List of tomato cultivars

References

Hybrid tomato cultivars